National Express Germany is a railway operator in Germany. A subsidiary of National Express, it commenced trading in December 2015.

History

In February 2013 National Express was awarded two regional rail contracts in Germany by the Verkehrsverbund Rhein-Ruhr, Zweckverband Nahverkehr Rheinland and Zweckverband Nahverkehr Westfalen-Lippe authorities that commenced on 13 December 2015.

In January 2015 the Bayerische Eisenbahngesellschaft awarded National Express a contract to operate the Nuremberg S-Bahn system from December 2018. It was to have been the first Deutsche Bahn S-Bahn network to be taken over by a private operator. However, in October 2016, National Express withdrew its bid after an appeal to the award was launched by Deutsche Bahn, National Express stating an inability to order new rolling stock while the challenge was heard would make its bid unviable.

In June 2015 National Express was awarded parts 2 and 3 of the Rhein-Ruhr-Express which will commence in stages between June 2019 and December 2020.

Following the financial difficulties of Abellio GmbH, National Express was awarded an emergency contract to operate further services in North Rhine-Westphalia from February 2022 to run for two years.
 Rhein-Express (RE/RRX 1) Aachen-Hamm
 Rhein-Express (RE11) Düsseldorf-Kassel.

Services

Rolling stock
To commence operations, National Express purchased 35 Bombardier Talent 2s in 2014. These were sold back to the Rhine-Ruhr Transport Association and Westphalia-Lippe Local Transport and leased back to National Express for the duration of the contract. The Rhein-Ruhr-Express services are operated by Siemens Desiro HCs.

References

National Express companies
Railway companies of Germany
Railway companies established in 2015
2015 establishments in Germany
Companies based in Cologne